The Paktia Super Kings, formerly known as the Paktia Panthers, is an Afghan professional Twenty20 cricket franchise team that competes in the Afghanistan Premier League. The team is based in Khost, the provincial capital of Khost Province and the largest city of Loya Paktia region, Afghanistan. The team was formed in 2018, as a result of the formation of the Afghanistan Premier League by Afghanistan Cricket Board. The team is currently captained by Shahid Afridi, and coached by Dawlat Ahmadzai, a former member of the Afghanistan national cricket team. Shahid Afridi is the icon player of the franchise.

Squad

Administration and Supporting staff
 Head coach:  Dawlat Ahmadzai

References

Afghan domestic cricket competitions
Cricket clubs established in 2018
2018 in Afghan cricket
Afghanistan Premier League teams